The Legend of Inikpi is a 2020 Nigerian epic drama film directed by Frank Rajah Arase. The film stars Nancy Ameh in the titular role. The film was the debut as a film producer for actress Mercy Johnson. Set in the ancient kingdoms of Igala and Benin, the plot revolves around the story of two kingdoms on the brink of war. The film was premiered on 19 January 2020 and had its theatrical release on 24 January 2020 in Nigeria and Ghana. It was opened to positive reviews and became a box office success. It became the highest-grossing epic historical film in the Nollywood industry, grossing over 20 million, surpassing the previous record set by the 2016 film Ayamma.

Cast 

 Nancy Ameh as Princess Inikpi
 Mercy Johnson as Queen Omelve
 Sam Dede as Attah Ayegba
 Paul Obazele as Oba Esigie

References 

2020 films
2020s historical drama films
Nigerian drama films
Nigerian epic films
English-language Nigerian films
2020s English-language films